Songs I Left Behind is the fourth solo album by Mike Tramp. Released in 2004, the album came out only one year after his last studio album More to Life Than This.

The album is a collection of songs recorded in the last seven years and never before released until now. Mike Tramp decided to look through his archives and compile some of the songs that were either demoed or recorded during the sessions of his solo-albums and simply were "left behind" for various reasons.

Overview
The album features bonus alternate versions of "Falling Down" and "Darkness", both originally released on his second solo album Recovering the Wasted Years.

Following the release of this solo album, Tramp took a break from his solo career to focus more on the new White Lion. After the release of a White Lion/Mike Tramp box set and the album Last Roar which were also released in 2004, the new White Lion released the live album Rocking the USA in 2005 and began recording what would become White Lion's first original studio album in sixteen years, Return of the Pride.

Track listing

Personnel
 Mike Tramp - vocals, electric guitar, acoustic guitar
 Oliver Steffensen - guitar  
 Claus Langeskov - bass guitar  
 Kasper Foss - drums
 Dan Hemmer - Hammond B-3
 Kasper Damgaard - guitar
 Kenny Korade - rhythm guitar
 Jerry Best - bass guitar

References

2004 albums
Mike Tramp albums